Armorines: Project S.W.A.R.M., known as simply Armorines in Europe, is a 1999 first-person shooter developed by Acclaim Studios London and released for the Nintendo 64, Game Boy Color and PlayStation. It is based on the Armorines comic book from Valiant Comics, which was bought by Acclaim Entertainment.

Gameplay
Armorines: Project S.W.A.R.M. is a first-person shooter with some on-rail segments. The game features five different environments taking place on earth and in space and has two characters to choose from: Tony Lewis and Myra Lane. Each character has a different starting weapon. Tony uses a slower but stronger gun than Myra, while Myra uses a faster machine gun-like weapon, which causes less damage. Additional weapons can be picked up throughout the game. The weapons available depend on which character the player chooses to play as. Each character features 3 weapons, while there are 5 special weapons. Each one of the special weapons is exclusive to a specific environment and can be powered up 3 times in its respective environment.

Armorines includes a co-op campaign and a multiplayer versus mode. The versus mode can accommodate up to 4 players, while the co-op mode supports 2 players. The Versus mode has 4 gameplay types:
Deathmatch: Playable by 2-4 players. This game mode's objective is to get the most kills. The game can have a target amount of kills or have a timer set.
Racewars: Playable by 2-4 players. In this game mode player can choose to play as any of the alien bug species, each one possessing different attributes and abilities. The objective in this game mode is get the most kills. The game can have a target amount of kills or have a timer set.
Capture The Flag: This is a team based game for 2-4 players. The objective is to steal the other teams flag and return it to your base,
King Of The Hill: Playable by 2-4 players. The player must find the score zone, marked by a large flag, and stay inside of it to score points.

Plot
A group of marines fitted with advanced futuristic suits of armor protect Earth from an invasion of extraterrestrial, spider-like beings. The marines protect the Earth by killing the spiders with their weapons. The game features 2 protagonists and playable characters, Tony Lewis and Myra Lane. Each character has a different load-out equipped with their Armorine suit. They are Armorines, a highly advanced, highly classified virtually indestructible fighting force equipped to survive the terrifying might of a nuclear conflict.

Development
Armorines was developed by Acclaim Studios London and uses the Turok 2: Seeds of Evil engine. By using a Nintendo 64 Expansion Pak, the Nintendo 64 version can output high-resolution graphics (640x480). It is also compatible with the Rumble Pak.

Reception

The Game Boy Color and Nintendo 64 versions received mixed reviews, while the PlayStation version received unfavourable reviews, according to the review aggregation website GameRankings. Doug Trueman of NextGen gave both the N64 and PlayStation versions negative reviews in two separate issues, first calling the former "a great step backward from Turok 2. If you're desperate to kill bugs, buy a can of Raid instead" (#62, February 2000); and later saying of the latter, "Like the plot of so many science-fiction horror flicks, this was a good idea gone horribly wrong" (#69, September 2000). In Japan, where the latter was ported and published by Acclaim Japan on 13 July 2000, Famitsu gave it a score of 21 out of 40.

Notes

References

External links

keen games/Neon Studios page

1999 video games
Acclaim Entertainment games
Alien invasions in video games
Nintendo 64 games
PlayStation (console) games
Game Boy Color games
Video games about insects
Video games based on comics
Video games based on Valiant Comics
Video games developed in the United Kingdom
Video games featuring female protagonists
Multiplayer and single-player video games
First-person shooters